Parkville (known as Park Street during early planning) is a bus rapid transit station on the CTfastrak line, located near the intersection of Park Street and Francis Avenue in Hartford, Connecticut. It opened with the line on March 28, 2015. The station consists of two side platforms serving the busway, with two center passing lanes to allow express buses to pass buses stopped at the station.

The New York and New England Railroad (and predecessor Hartford, Providence and Fishkill Railroad) served a station approximately at the modern location. It opened around 1871, with a wooden depot built the next year. It may have been served until the end of passenger service between Hartford and New Britain in 1959. Trains using the parallel Springfield Line, originally built by the Hartford and New Haven Railroad, did not stop at Parkville.

References

External links

CTfastrak
Transport infrastructure completed in 2015
2015 establishments in Connecticut
Buildings and structures in Hartford, Connecticut
Bus stations in Hartford County, Connecticut
Former railway stations in Connecticut